A darter or snakebird is a bird of the genus Anhinga.

Darter may also refer to:

Animals
 Darter (fish), a group of fish from North America
 Crenuchidae, a family of fish from South America and Panama
 Dragonflies of the genus Sympetrum

Other
 A person who throws or uses darts
 , a submarine commissioned in 1943 and wrecked in 1944
 ,  a submarine in commission from 1956 to 1989
 AIS Canberra Darters, a defunct Australian netball team

See also
 A-Darter and R-Darter, air-to-air missiles manufactured by Denel Dynamics

Animal common name disambiguation pages